Henry Sloman may refer to:

 Henry Brarens Sloman (1848–1931), businessman and banker
 Henry Stanhope Sloman (1861–1945), British Army officer